The New Mexico Tourism Department is a state agency of New Mexico, headquartered in the Lamy Building in Santa Fe. It publishes New Mexico Magazine and distributes New Mexico True Television.

References

External links
 New Mexico Tourism Department

State agencies of New Mexico
Tourism in New Mexico